Michael Kovats de Fabriczy (often simply Michael Kovats; ; 1724 – May 11, 1779) was a Hungarian nobleman and cavalry officer who served in the Continental Army during the American Revolutionary War, in which he was killed in action. General Casimir Pulaski and Kovats are together known as the "Founding Fathers of the US Cavalry."

Early life

Kovats was born Michael Kovats de Keszi et Kaal ( és Kaal Kováts Mihály) in Karcag, Hungary. In English historical records his family name is sometimes spelled "Kowatz" or "Kowatsch". He later assumed the toponymic ‘de Fabriczy’ (also spelled Fabriczi or Fabriczki in Hungarian and Fabricy in English). 

A nobleman, he became an officer in the Hungarian cavalry under Maria Theresa. He later became captain in the Prussian Cavalry, serving under Frederick the Great and earning the highest distinction in the Prussian Army, the Pour le Mérite. He married Franciska, daughter of nobleman Sigismund Merse de Szinye (Szinye Merse Zsigmond), with whom he has one son, George (György). Their son died at a young age and the two later separated.

Correspondence with Benjamin Franklin

In 1777, after learning about the American Revolution, he offered his sword to the American ambassador in France, Benjamin Franklin. In a letter that has since become famous, he wrote in Latin:

Most Illustrious Sir:

Golden freedom cannot be purchased with yellow gold.

I, who have the honor to present this letter to your Excellency, am also following the call of the Fathers of the Land, as the pioneers of freedom always did. I am a free man and a Hungarian. As to my military status I was trained in the Royal Prussian Army and raised from the lowest rank to the dignity of a Captain of the Hussars, not so much by luck and the mercy of chance than by most diligent self discipline and the virtue of my arms. The dangers and the bloodshed of a great many campaigns taught me how to mold a soldier, and, when made, how to arm him and let him defend the dearest of the lands with his best ability under any conditions and developments of the war.

I now am here of my own free will, having taken all the horrible hardships and bothers of this journey, and I am willing to sacrifice myself wholly and faithfully as it is expected of an honest soldier facing the hazards and great dangers of the war, to the detriment of Joseph and as well for the freedom of your great Congress. Through the cooperation and loyal assistance of Mr. Faedevill, a merchant of this city and a kind sympathizer of the Colonies and their just cause, I have obtained passage on a ship called "Catharina Froam Darmouth", whose master is a Captain Whippy. I beg your Excellency, to grant me a passport and a letter of recommendation to the most benevolent Congress. I am expecting companions who have not yet reached here. Your Excellency would be promoting the common cause by giving Mr. Faedevill authorization to expedite their passage to the Colonies once they have arrived here.

At last, awaiting your gracious answer, I have no wish greater than to leave forthwith, to be where I am needed most, to serve and die in everlasting obedience to Your Excellency and the Congress.

Most faithful unto death,

Bordeaux, January 13th, 1777.
Michael Kovats de Fabricy

P.S.: As yet I am unable to write fluently in French or English and had only the choice of writing either in German or Latin; for this I apologize to your Excellency.

Military career in America

Upon his arrival in America, Kováts joined Casimir Pulaski, who was then brigadier general and commander-in-chief of Washington's cavalry. Pulaski's cavalry was poorly trained. The small number of trained cavalry officers available made the task of commanding the forces formidable. On February 4, 1778, Pulaski proposed a plan for the formation of a training division of hussars. In a letter to Washington Pulaski wrote: "There is an officer now in this Country whose name is Kovach. I know him to have served with reputation in the Prussian service and assure Your Excellency that he is in every way equal to his undertaking." Later, in another letter to Washington dated March 19, Pulaski again recommended Kovats: "I would propose, for my subaltern, an experienced officer, by name Kowacz, formerly a Colonel and partisan in the Prussian service."

Pulaski's Legion was commissioned by the Continental Congress on March 28, 1778, and Michael Kováts was named colonel commandant of the legion on April 18, 1778. He was finally allowed to perform the task he had initially been intended: to organize and train hussar regiments for the American army. The recruiting of men began almost immediately, and by October 1778, the legion consisted of 330 officers and men. Kováts trained these men in the tradition of Hungarian hussars: in basic form, training and organization, they were similar to their European counterparts.

In October, the legion was transferred to New Jersey and sent into battle with the British at Osborne Island on the 10th and Egg Harbor on the 14th. With winter's approach, the legion was ordered to Cole's Fort, where they spent the first part of the winter in training. On February 2, 1779, the army marched to South Carolina to join the forces of General Benjamin Lincoln. During the long march, smallpox took its toll: only 150 soldiers arrived in Charleston—more than half of the legion had died of disease along the way.
The Siege of Charleston was underway. The situation was critical, the population urged for surrender. Pulaski's legion arrived on May 8, 1779, and unsuccessfully attacked the British troops led by General Prevost on May 11. In the battle on May 11, 1779, in Charleston, South Carolina, Colonel Michael Kováts lost his life in the war for American independence. He was buried where he fell. His British opponent in the battle, Brigade Major Skelly, paid Pulaski’s Legion the highest of compliments during the requiem, describing it as, "the best cavalry the rebels ever had."

Legacy

A phrase from his letter to Franklin, "Most Faithful unto Death" (Fidelissimus ad Mortem) has since been taken as the motto of the American Hungarian Federation. On May 11, 1779, Colonel Kovats gave his life in the American War for Independence while leading the Continental Army cavalry he had trained in Hungarian hussar tactics against a British Siege of Charleston.

To this date, Michael de Kovats is celebrated by cadets at The Citadel Military College in Charleston, South Carolina, where part of the campus is named in his honor. The Hungarian Embassy in Washington, D.C., has a statue sculpted by Paul Takacs and executed by Attila Dienes.

The World War II Liberty Ship  was named in his honor.

See also

 Casimir Pulaski, along with Kovats, "the father of American cavalry"
 Tadeusz Kościuszko, Polish military engineer who played a key role in improving Continental Army defenses during the American Revolution
 Hungarian-Polish Friendship Day 
 István Kováts

References

External links
 Hungarian US military heroes
 Col. Michael Kovats by the American Hungarian Federation
 The Citadel Archives: Kovats, Col. Michael De

1724 births
1779 deaths
People from Karcag
Continental Army officers from Hungary
Hungarian nobility
United States military personnel killed in the American Revolutionary War
Hungarian emigrants to the United States
Hussars